Ryan Yuuki Hirooka (広岡 勇輝, Hirooka Yuuki, born 18 February 1990) is a Japanese professional footballer who plays for Portuguese club Estrela B as a right winger.

Career statistics

References 

Living people
English footballers
National League (English football) players
Japanese people of English descent
English people of Japanese descent
Japanese footballers
1990 births
Association football wingers
Ramsgate F.C. players
Lewes F.C. players
JEF United Chiba players
Associação Naval 1º de Maio players
Campeonato de Portugal (league) players
Boavista F.C. players
C.D. Feirense players
Liga Portugal 2 players
Leixões S.C. players
S.C. Covilhã players
RSD Alcalá players
Tercera División players
Japanese expatriate footballers
English expatriate footballers
Expatriate footballers in Portugal
Expatriate footballers in Spain